Clafoutis (or ), sometimes spelled clafouti in  Anglophone countries, is a baked French dessert of fruit, traditionally black cherries, arranged in a buttered dish and covered with a thick flan-like batter. The clafoutis is dusted with powdered sugar and served lukewarm, sometimes with cream.

A traditional Limousin clafoutis contains not only the flesh of the cherries used, but also the nut-like kernels. Cherry kernels contain benzaldehyde, the compound responsible for the dominant flavour in almond extract. They also contain a small amount of amygdalin, a cyanogenic glycoside - a compound potentially capable of releasing cyanide if consumed,  but non-toxic in small quantities.

Origins
Clafoutis comes from the Limousin region of France, and while black cherries are traditional, there are numerous variations using other fruits, including red cherries, plums, prunes, apples, pears, cranberries or blackberries. When other kinds of fruit are used instead of cherries, the dish is properly called a flaugnarde.

One reported derivation of dish's name is from Occitan clafotís, from the verb clafir, meaning "to fill" (implied: "the batter with cherries").. Another reported derivation is that clafir comes from old French claufir, meaning "to fix with nails," explained as the cherries having the appearance of nail heads. Clafoutis apparently spread throughout France during the 19th century.

Cultural references
In her autobiographical novel The War: A Memoir, French resister and writer Marguerite Duras carefully gathers up the rationed ingredients to make her husband a clafoutis when he returns from the concentration camps, only to find that he is too weak from malnutrition and exposure to eat it.

See also
 List of French dishes
 List of French desserts

References

Occitan desserts
French desserts
Custard desserts
Fruit dishes